The Group of Transylvanian Saxons (GST) was a political party active in interwar Romania representing the minority rights of the Transylvanian Saxons, a sub-group of the ethnic German community in Romania who have been living in Transylvania since the High Middle Ages.

History
In the 1919 elections it won eight seats in the Chamber of Deputies and three in the Senate. However, it did not contest any further elections.

Electoral history

Legislative elections

References

German diaspora political parties
Defunct political parties in Romania
German organizations in Romania
Political parties of minorities in Romania
Regionalist parties in Romania